The Central District of Hirmand County is a district (bakhsh) in Hirmand County, Sistan and Baluchestan province, Iran. At the 2006 census, its population was 58,082, in 11,603 families.  The district has one city: Dust Mohammad. The district has three rural districts (dehestan): Dust Mohammad Rural District, Jahanabad Rural District, and Margan Rural District.

References 
Citations

Bibliography

Hirmand County
Districts of Sistan and Baluchestan Province